The 2020–21 Coupe de France preliminary rounds, Corsica was the qualifying competition to decide which teams from the leagues of the Corsica region of France took part in the main competition from the seventh round.

Two teams qualified from the Corsica Preliminary rounds. In 2019–20, FC Bastia-Borgo progressed the furthest in the main competition, reaching the ninth round before losing to Saint-Étienne 0–3.

Schedule
A total of 26 teams entered from the region. The opening round of the qualifying competition, analogous to the second round, took place on 6 September 2020, with six teams from Régional 2 and below entering at this stage. The remaining 16 teams from the Regional divisions, and the three teams from Championnat National 3 entered at the third round stage on 20 September 2020. The fourth round draw, featuring teams from Championnat National 2, took place on 24 September 2020. The fifth round draw, which saw the debut of the teams from Championnat National, took place on 8 October 2020. The sixth round draw was made on 22 October 2020.

Second round
The Preliminary rounds in Corsica start with the second round due to the relatively low number of teams competing.

These matches were played on 6 September 2020.

Third round
These matches were played on 19 and 20 September 2020.

Fourth round
These matches were played on 3 and 4 October 2020.

Fifth round
These matches were played on 18 October 2020, with two postponed until 24 and 28 October 2020.

Sixth round
These matches were played on 31 January 2021.

References

Preliminary rounds